Coptobasis ridopalis is a moth in the family Crambidae. It was described by Charles Swinhoe in 1892. It is found in India's Khasi Hills.

References

Moths described in 1892
Spilomelinae
Moths of Asia